We K-Pop is a South Korean variety program on KBS World which first aired on July 12, 2019. The show's four hosts, Kim Shin-young, 2PM's Nichkhun, SF9's Inseong and Stray Kids' Seungmin introduce K-pop artists each week, who perform and greet their global fans. The hosts are joined by Billboard K-Town's Jeff Benjamin for music talks. The show can be viewed on the TV station and on the KBS website.

Background
Music show host Kim Shin-young is joined by three active Korean idols who introduce two of their own groups in the first two episodes, Stray Kids and SF9. The show also includes English language talks with Billboard columnist Jeff Benjamin, known for his "deep affection" for K-pop, and whose articles have included BTS and their contributions to the North American and international music markets.

The show's format includes online fan participation and has a viewership of approximately 100 million global fans and household viewers from about 120 countries. Director Yoon Koun said the show's global fan meeting concept,"focuses on communication with fans and artists, unlike most other music programs." Fan responses and requests help decide which artists appear on the show, such as X1's selection. The show's Twitter account solicits fan questions for the guests, which are used in the show's production. The show hosts on-site events for its recordings with a studio audience of about 150 fans, and for example, on September 6, 2019, a few fans were selected to chat with X1 members on KakaoTalk, and included communication with fans through SNS. Along with fan interest for X1, Benjamin recommended the new group and participated in promoting them on his SNS, a part of his stated goal of helping spread K-pop internationally.

2019 episode guest list (1–present)

References

External links

2019 South Korean television series debuts
South Korean variety television shows
South Korean television talk shows
Korean-language television shows
Multiculturalism in South Korea
Korean Broadcasting System original programming